The European Youth Goals are a collection of 11 interlinked goals representing young people's vision for youth policy in the European Union (EU). The European Youth Goals were developed during the 6th cycle of the EU Youth Dialogue. The European Youth Goals were included in the EU Youth Strategy 2019–2027.

Development of the European Youth Goals 
The European Youth Goals were developed during the 6th cycle of the EU Youth Dialogue, which took place in 2017-2018 (during the presidency trio of Estonia, Austria and Bulgaria) under the title "Youth in Europe: What’s next?". The aim of the dialogue was to collect voices of young people and to contribute together to creating the EU Youth Strategy 2019–2027. To develop the European Youth Goals comprehensive consultations as well as three EU Youth Conferences took place, one in Tallinn, one in Vienna and one in Sofia. The European Youth Goals are supposed to reflect the views of European youth including especially those who were active in the EU Youth Dialogue.

The 11 European Youth Goals 
The European Youth Goals encompass 11 goals:

 Connecting EU with Youth
 Equality of All Genders
 Inclusive Societies
 Information & Constructive Dialogue
 Mental Health & Wellbeing
 Moving Rural Youth Forward
 Quality Employment for All
 Quality Learning
 Space and Participation for All
 Sustainable Green Europe
 Youth Organisations & European Programmes

References

External links
Website of the Austrian National Youth Council on the European Youth Goals
EU Youth Dialogue (official EU website)

European Union
Youth rights in Europe